Natalia Landauer may refer to:

Natalia Lanauer, character in I Am A Camera, played by Marian Winters
Natalia Landauer, a character in the 1972 film Cabaret played by Marisa Berenson